The Mysterious Island is a 1929 American science fiction film directed by Lucien Hubbard, based on Jules Verne's 1874 novel L'Île mystérieuse (The Mysterious Island). It was photographed largely in two-color Technicolor and released by Metro-Goldwyn-Mayer as a part-talkie feature, with some scenes with audible dialog and some that had only synchronized music and sound effects.

Plot
On a volcanic island near the kingdom of Hetvia rules Count Dakkar, a benevolent leader and scientist who has eliminated class distinction among the island's inhabitants. Dakkar, his daughter Sonia and her fiance, chief engineer Nicolai Roget, have designed a submarine boat which Roget pilots on its initial test voyage shortly before the island is overrun by Baron Falon, once Daggar's friend, and now the new despotic ruler of Hetvia. The Baron has Dakkar and his daughter tortured so that Dakkar will reveal all his discoveries. Dakkar is able to escape with the intervention of his loyal men. But Falon sets out after Roget and Dakkar using the Count's second submarine. The two underwater craft dive very deep to the ocean floor, where they discover a strange land populated by dragons, a giant octopus, and eerie, undiscovered humanoid race.

Cast
 Lionel Barrymore as Count Dakkar
 Jacqueline Gadsden as Sonia Dakkar
 Lloyd Hughes as Nikolai Roget
 Montagu Love as Falon
 Harry Gribbon as Mikhail
 Snitz Edwards as Anton
 Gibson Gowland as Dmitry
 Dolores Brinkman as Teresa
 Karl Dane (uncredited)
 Robert Dudley as Workman (uncredited)
 Angelo Rossitto as Underwater Creature (uncredited)
 Carl 'Major' Roup as Underwater Creature (uncredited)
 Billy Schuler (uncredited)
 Pauline Starke (uncredited)
 Jack Stoutenburg (uncredited)
 Harry Tenbrook as Workman (uncredited)
 Robert McKim (uncredited)

Production
The film had a budget of $1,130,000. According to an article in the original Famous Monsters of Filmland magazine, production was actually started in 1926. There were various problems, including weather and the advent of talkies, which slowed/halted production several times before the film was finally completed and released three years later. The article included stills showing the original 1926 undersea denizens and the redesigned version which actually appeared in the film. Footage directed by Maurice Tourneur and Benjamin Christensen in 1927 was incorporated into the final 1929 version.

Adaptation
The film is loosely based on the back-story given for Captain Nemo in the novel The Mysterious Island, and might more properly be thought of as a prequel to Twenty Thousand Leagues Under the Sea.  It is the story of Count Dakkar (Captain Nemo's real name is revealed to be Prince Dakkar in The Mysterious Island), how he built his submarine, how he was betrayed, and how he became an outcast seeking revenge.

Reception
The film's financial failure cost MGM $878,000.

Preservation
Until recently only one reel with a color sequence was thought to have survived, in the collection of the UCLA Film and Television Archive.

In 2013, Deborah Stoiber from the George Eastman House film archive visited Prague to examine the sole existing color copy of The Mysterious Island. The U.S. film experts, in cooperation with the Czech National Film Archive, restored the color print of The Mysterious Island. After the complete Technicolor print was discovered in Prague in December 2013, a new print of the film premiered at the 33rd Pordenone Silent Film Festival in October 2014.

The film is available March 26, 2019 on MOD from Warner Archive collection, but only in an unrestored black and white print.

See also
 List of early color feature films
 Lionel Barrymore filmography

References

Works cited

External links

 
 
 
 
 Lantern slide (archived)
 (The Mysterious Island screen test at 4:12)

1929 films
1920s science fiction films
1920s color films
American science fiction films
1920s English-language films
Films directed by Maurice Tourneur
Films directed by Benjamin Christensen
Metro-Goldwyn-Mayer films
Films based on The Mysterious Island
1920s rediscovered films
Science fiction submarine films
Transitional sound films
Rediscovered American films
1920s American films